Islam is the official religion in Kuwait, and the majority of the citizen population are Muslim. There are also small native Christian and Baháʼí Faith populations. Most expatriates in Kuwait are Muslim, Hindu, Christian or Buddhist.

Islam 

Kuwait's official state religion is Maliki Sunni Islam. There is no official national census disclosing sectarian affiliation. Most Muslim Kuwaiti citizens are Sunni. Shia Muslims are a significant minority in Kuwait. Several other Muslim sects do exist in Kuwaiti society but in very small numbers. Over one million non-citizen Muslims reside in Kuwait.

The Al Sabah ruling family including the Emir adhere to the Maliki madhhab of Sunni Islam.

Population estimates 
In 2001, there were an estimated 525,000 Sunni Kuwaiti citizens and 300,000 Shia Kuwaiti citizens. In 2002, the US Department of State estimated that there were 525,000 Sunni Kuwaiti citizens and 855,000 Kuwaiti citizens in total (61% Sunnis, 39% Shias). In 2004, there were an estimated 600,000 Sunni Kuwaiti citizens, 300,000-350,000 Shia Kuwaiti citizens and 913,000 Kuwaiti citizens in total. In 2007, it was estimated that around 70% of citizens belonged to the Sunni branch of Islam while the remaining 30% were Shias.  The Strategic Studies Institute estimated that Sunnis constitute 60% of the population in 2008.

Christianity 

Christianity is a minority religion in Kuwait. Kuwait has a native Christian community, with a total population of between 200 and 400. In 2020, there were an estimated 289 Christian Kuwaitis residing in Kuwait. Kuwait is the only GCC country besides Bahrain to have a local Christian population who hold citizenship. Of the non-citizen population, there are an estimated 837,585 Christians (31 December 2020), or 17.93% of the population.

The government-recognized Christian churches include the Catholic Church, the Coptic Orthodox Church, the National Evangelical Church Kuwait (Protestant), the Armenian Apostolic Church, the Greek Orthodox Church, the Greek Catholic (Melkite) Church, the Anglican Church, and the Church of Jesus Christ of Latter-day Saints. There are also many Christian religious groups not officially recognised by the government with smaller populations, including the Indian Orthodox, Mar Thoma, and Seventh-day Adventist Church. Unrecognized groups are generally free to worship in private. There are also a number of believers in Christ from a Muslim background in the country, though many are not citizens. A 2015 study estimates that around 350 people in the country follow these beliefs.

Baháʼí
There are a small number of Kuwaiti citizens who follow the Baháʼí Faith. While the official 2013 census only shows three religion categories: "Muslim", "Christian" and "Other", with only 18 people in the other category, another source states that there are around 400 Baháʼís in total in Kuwait.

Judaism 

There were several Kuwaiti Jewish families before the 1950s, however all local Jewish families left Kuwait by the 1980s.

Hinduism 

There are estimated 300,000 non-citizen Hindus in Kuwait.

Buddhism 
Approximately 85,000 non-citizen Buddhists reside in Kuwait.

Sikhism 
There are estimated 10,000 non-citizen Sikhs in Kuwait.

Religion by Nationality (2020)

See also 
 Demographics of Kuwait

References